Irving Eugene Spikes (born December 21, 1970, in Ocean Springs, Mississippi, United States) is a former professional American football player who played running back for four seasons for the Miami Dolphins.

1970 births
Living people
American football running backs
Miami Dolphins players
Alabama Crimson Tide football players
Louisiana–Monroe Warhawks football players